Arthur Kimmig Getz (May 17, 1913 – January 19, 1996) was an American illustrator best known for his fifty-year career as a cover artist for The New Yorker magazine. Between 1938 and 1988, two hundred and thirteen Getz covers appeared on The New Yorker, making Getz the most prolific New Yorker cover artist of the twentieth century. Getz was also a fine artist, painted murals for the Works Progress Administration Program, wrote and illustrated children's books, and taught at the School of Visual Arts in New York City, the University of Connecticut, and the Washington Art Association in Washington, Connecticut. In addition to his New Yorker covers and spot drawings, Getz's illustrations were published in American Childhood, Audubon, Collier's, Consumer Reports, Cue, Esquire, Fortune, The Nation, The National Guardian, The New Masses, The New Republic, PM, Reader's Digest, Saturday Review, Stage, and The Reporter.

Early years 

Arthur Getz was born in Passaic, New Jersey, the son of Madeline Kimmig Getz and Anthony Getz. He attended Pratt Institute in Brooklyn, New York, on a full scholarship, and graduated with honors in 1934 from Pratt's School of Fine and Applied Art. His very first cover illustration for The New Yorker was printed on July 23, 1938.

Murals 

In 1939, Philip Guston taught Getz how to mix casein tempera, a milk-based pigment utilized for mural painting, and suggested that Getz apply for a New Deal mural contract. Over the next four years, Getz won four mural contracts:
 1939: Post Office, Lancaster, New York
 1939: Textile Building, 1939 New York World's Fair
 1941: Post Office, Bronson, Michigan
 1942: Post Office, Luverne, Alabama

The New Yorker 

After serving in the Philippines during World War II as a First Lieutenant of Field Artillery, Getz returned to New York City and resumed his work as an artist, soon becoming one of the more regular contributors to The New Yorker. During the 1950s and 1960s it was not unusual for more than one Getz cover to be printed on The New Yorker during a single month.

The writer John Updike, in his foreword to The Complete Book of Covers from The New Yorker, 1925 – 1989, wrote: "The artist who has contributed most covers is Arthur Getz, whose alert eye and confident brush find endless silent dramas of contrast and tone in the world around us; beginning in 1938 and still producing, he has thus far published two hundred and thirteen."

Lee Lorenz, the former Art Editor of The New Yorker, wrote of Getz: "[He] seems to have found his particular subject, the special light of Manhattan … Arthur's paintings are a chronicle of New York's moods to be set alongside Guardi's paintings of Venice." Lorenz also wrote of Getz, "He drew inspiration equally from the night clubs of Manhattan and the apple orchards of New England, but his covers, taken as a group, seem really to be about the joy of painting itself."

In addition to his work as an illustration artist, Getz continued to pursue fine art painting. In 1960 he was offered a one-man show at the Babcock Gallery in New York City. The gallery director requested that Getz, already well known for his covers, exhibit his fine art under a different name, concerned that Getz's association with "commercial" (illustration) art would hinder his recognition as a fine artist. Getz used his middle name, Kimmig, for his signature on his fine art work. Many paintings from this era are signed "Kimmig"; some Getz re-signed later and are signed both "Kimmig" and "Getz."

In 1963 Getz and his first wife, Margarita Gibbons, were divorced. Getz later married writer Anne Carriere, and shortly after relocated from New York City to Sharon, Connecticut in 1969, where Getz lived until his death in 1996. His move to Connecticut marked a shift in the mood of his New Yorker covers from the city-centered work of his past. He began to depict more rural scenes of the countryside, familiar to the growing commuter and weekender populations. During this time Getz also wrote and illustrated four children's books and illustrated numerous others, including Jennifer's Walk, authored by Anne Carriere (Getz and Carriere divorced in 1973).

On August 29, 1988, Getz's 213th and final New Yorker cover was printed. Though a stroke rendered Getz blind in one eye in 1994, he continued to paint and draw until his death on January 19, 1996, at the age of 83.

Works

Stories and illustrations by Getz 

 Hamilton Duck, Golden Books, 1972
 Hamilton Duck's Springtime Story, Golden Books, 1974
 Tar Beach, Dial Press, 1979
 Humphrey, The Dancing Pig	Dial Press, 1980

Illustrations by Getz 

 Double Trouble by May Garelick, Thomas Y. Crowell, 1958
  Jennifer's Walk by Anne Carriere, Golden Books, 1973
 Mr. Goat's Bad Good Idea by Marileta Robinson, Thomas Y. Crowell, 1979
 Gator  & Mary's Traveling Band by David Martin, Dial Press, 1981
 Prisoners of the Good Fight by Carl Geiser, Lawrence Hill & Co., 1986

Represented in 

 The New Yorker Album, 1950 - 1955  Harper & Bros., 1955
 A Century of American Illustration,  Brooklyn Museum Press, 1972 
 The Northlight Collection, Fletcher Art Services, 1972 
 The Creative Expression, North River Press, 1975 
 Seasons at The New Yorker,  National Academy of Design, 1984 
 The Complete Book of Covers from The New Yorker, 1925 – 1989,  Alfred A. Knopf, 1989
 The Art of The New Yorker, 1925 - 1995,  by Lee Lorenz, Alfred A.  Knopf, 1995
 Covering The New Yorker: Cutting-Edge Covers From A Literary Institution,  Abbeville Press, 2000
 The Illustrator in America, 1860 - 2000,  by Walt Reed, The Society of Illustrators, 2001

Sources 
 Getz interview (pages 63–78) in The Creative Expression, North River Press, 1975
 Getz article, "Arthur Getz introduces you to the Encaustic Process and to a selection of his covers for The New Yorker Magazine (pages 104-109), The Northlight Collection, Fletcher Art Services, 1972
 Getz bio, page 272, The Illustrator in America, 1860 - 2000, The Society of Illustrators, 2001
 Getz bio, page 146, A Century of American Illustration, Brooklyn Museum Press, 1972
 John Updike quote: The Complete Book of Covers from The New Yorker, 1925 – 1989 (Alfred A. Knopf, 1989)
 Margarita Gibbons papers, Smithsonian Institution Collection, 
 The Art of The New Yorker, 1925 - 1995,  Alfred A.  Knopf, 1995
 Lee Lorenz quote: "Family Album: Arthur Getz" - The New Yorker, February 5, 1996

References

External links 

 
 Lorenz tribute
 Article on Getz Covers
 New York Times Obituary

1913 births
1996 deaths
The New Yorker people
Painters from New York City
American children's writers
American illustrators
American muralists
20th-century American painters
American male painters
People from Passaic, New Jersey
People from Sharon, Connecticut
Artists from New Jersey
Pratt Institute alumni
School of Visual Arts faculty
University of Connecticut faculty
Section of Painting and Sculpture artists
20th-century American male artists